Henry Francis Fisher (in German Heinrich Franz Fischer, 1805–1867) was a notable German Texan. Born in Kassel, Hesse in 1805, Fisher left the mainland in late 1833 spending a year each, in London and New York, and two in New Orleans.  He crossed over into Texas either in 1837 or early 1838, stopping in Houston, Texas where he served as consul to the Hanseatic League (Bremen)  Texas. He became interested in the exploration and colonization of the San Saba, Texas area and in 1839 was acting treasurer of the San Saba Company, which was later reorganized as the San Saba Colonization Company. He was a key part in the Fisher–Miller Land Grant.  He spoke German and additionally Spanish and English when Texas came under Mexican and U.S. rules.

References

 Biesele, Rudolph L. "Fisher-Miller Land Grant". Handbook of Texas Online. Texas State Historical Association. Retrieved 12 February 2011.

External links
 https://tshaonline.org/handbook/online/articles/ffi17

Hanseatic diplomats
1805 births
1867 deaths
People from Kassel
German-American history
German emigrants to the Republic of Texas
German-American culture in Texas
Hessian emigrants to the United States
People from San Saba, Texas